Samma is a village in Viru-Nigula Parish, Lääne-Viru County, in northeastern Estonia. It has a population of 32 (as of 1 January 2011).

References

External links
Samma Manor at Estonian Manors Portal

Villages in Lääne-Viru County